Calamotropha fuscivittalis is a moth in the family Crambidae. It was described by George Hampson in 1910. It is found in Zambia.

References

Crambinae
Moths described in 1910